Augustin Legrand is a French actor. He replaced Jonathan Goldsmith as Dos Equis' Most Interesting Man in the World in 2016.

References

External links

Place of birth missing (living people)
Year of birth missing (living people)
21st-century French male actors
Living people